Kaláka is a folk music group formed in Budapest, Hungary on November 26, 1969. The founding members are Dániel Gryllus, Vilmos Gryllus, István Mikó and Balázs Radványi. Later Mikó was replaced by Péter Dabasi who in turn was replaced by Péter Huzella and later by Gábor Becze. Tamás Kobzos Kiss was also a member of the band for a short time. They have been in their current lineup since 1996.

Since 1980 they have organized the Kaláka Folk Festival every July in the Castle of Diósgyőr, Miskolc.

The word kaláka means "working together" in some Hungarian dialects.

Members
Gábor Becze: double bass, guitar
Dániel Gryllus: flute, zither, pan flute, clarinet, tárogató, bagpipe
Vilmos Gryllus: cello, guitar, charango, lute, Jew's harp
Balázs Radványi: mandolin, 12-string guitar, ukulele, cuatro, viola, kalimba

Works
Music and poetry

Several poems by Hungarian and foreign poets were set to tune by Kaláka, including János Arany, Endre Ady, Sándor Weöres, Dezső Kosztolányi, Sándor Kányádi, Lőrinc Szabó, Attila József, Robert Burns, François Villon, Sergei Yesenin.

Kaláka have released about 1000 songs and 25 albums.

Soundtracks

They composed the theme for the cartoon series Hungarian Folk Tales.

Concerts and tours

They often give concerts for children. All the musicians learned by the Kodály method in primary school and utilize what they learnt there about music education.

Kaláka have toured abroad in the following countries: Austria, Argentina, Belgium, Bosnia, Brazil, Bulgaria, Canada, Chile, the Republic of China, Croatia, the Czech Republic, Denmark, Estonia, Finland, France, Germany, Italy, Japan, the Netherlands, Norway, Poland, Portugal, Romania, Slovakia, Slovenia, the Soviet Union, Sweden, Switzerland, Ukraine, Venezuela, Yugoslavia, South Korea.

Discography
 Kaláka (1977)
 Az én koromban (1981)
 A fekete ember (1984)
 Oda s vissza. Holland versek magyarul (1984)
 A pelikán (1985)
 Szabad-e bejönni ide betlehemmel? (1987)
 Az én szívemben boldogok a tárgyak (1988)
 Villon – Kaláka (1988)
 Boldog szomorú dal (1989)
 Ukulele (1993)
 Kaláka 25 (1994)
 Hol a nadrágom? (1995)
 Bőrönd Ödön (1996)
 Varázsvirágok (1998)
 Hajnali rigók (1998)
 Nálatok laknak-e állatok? (1998)
 Kaláka 30 (1999)
 Egyetemi Színpad '76 (2002)
 Csak az egészség meglegyen (2003)
 Kaláka – Kányádi (2004)
 Kaláka – Kosztolányi (2005)
 Karácsonyi Kaláka (2005)
 Madáretető (2006)
 Kaláka – Arany János (2007)
 Ukulele – Kaláka verseskönyv gyerekeknek (2007)

Books 
 A Kaláka (első) 40 éve (Kaláka – The First 40 Years) (2010)

External links
 Kaláka.hu – Official site
 Kaláka Festival official site

Hungarian folk music groups